Etruria was a protected cruiser of the Italian Regia Marina (Royal Navy) built in the 1891 by Cantiere navale fratelli Orlando Livorno.

Etruria spent her early career with the main fleet in the Mediterranean Sea. In the early 1900s, she spent much of her time in North and South American waters; she visited the United States for the Jamestown Exposition and the Hudson–Fulton Celebration in 1907 and 1909. The ship took part in the Italo-Turkish War of 1911–1912, primarily by providing gunfire support to Italian troops in North Africa. Reduced to a training ship by World War I, Etruria was deliberately sunk by the Regia Marina in Livorno to convince Austria-Hungary that its espionage network had not been compromised by double agents.

Design

The ships had a ram bow and a flush deck. Each vessel was fitted with a pair of pole masts. She had a crew of between 213 and 278.

Her propulsion system consisted of a pair of horizontal triple-expansion steam engines that drove two screw propellers. Steam was supplied by four cylindrical fire-tube boilers that were vented into two funnels.

Etruria was armed with a main battery of four  L/40 guns mounted singly, with two side by side forward and two side by side aft. A secondary battery of six  L/40 guns were placed between them, with three on each broadside. Close-range defense against torpedo boats consisted of eight  guns two  guns, and a pair of machine guns. She was also equipped with two  torpedo tubes.

Service history
Etruria was laid down at the Odero-Terni-Orlando shipyard in Livorno on 1 April 1889. Shortages of funding slowed the completion Etruria and her sister ships. Tight budgets forced the navy to reduce the pace of construction so that the funds could be used to keep the active fleet in service. As a result, it took two years to complete her hull, which was launched on 23 April 1891. Fitting-out work proceeded even more slowly; she was not ready for commissioning until 11 July 1894. Following her commissioning, Etruria was assigned to the Second Division of the Italian fleet in October 1894, along with the ironclad battleships , two cruisers and six torpedo boats. On 20 June 1895, Etruria and a fleet that included the battleships Sardegna, and Ruggiero di Lauria, visited Germany for the ceremony of the opening of the Kaiser Wilhelm Canal. Contingents from Britain, France, Russia, Spain, and several other countries joined the celebration.

Etruria was stationed in the Red Sea to support colonial forces in Italian Eritrea in 1902. In April 1907, Etruria and the armored cruiser  crossed the Atlantic to represent Italy during the Jamestown Exposition, the commemoration of the 300th anniversary of the Jamestown colony, the first permanent English settlement in the Americas. In addition to the Austro-Hungarian delegation, the international fleet consisted of warships from Great Britain, Japan, Germany, Austria-Hungary, and several other nations. Etruria returned to the United States in September 1909 for the Hudson–Fulton Celebration in New York City, which also included ships from the German, British, and French fleets, among others, in addition to the hosting US Navy. On this occasion, she was joined by the training cruiser .

Etruria also represented Italy at the commemoration of Peruvian pilot Jorge Chávez on 27 October 1910, who had been killed in a crash attempting to cross the Alps from France to Italy a month before. The French cruiser  joined Etruria for the event. The ship made another visit to the United States in March 1911, this time in San Francisco. Her visit coincided with the 50th anniversary of the proclamation of the Kingdom of Italy on 17 March; Etruria fired a 21-gun salute in honor of the anniversary, which was returned by the US Navy training facility in the harbor.

On 29 September 1911, Italy declared war on the Ottoman Empire in order to seize Libya. At the time, Etruria was still in American waters, but she was quickly recalled. On 18 October, she joined the escort for a troop convoy headed to Benghazi. The convoy was heavily protected against a possible Ottoman attack: the escort comprised the four  pre-dreadnought battleships, her sister  and another cruiser, and five destroyers. The Italian fleet bombarded the city the next morning after the Ottoman garrison refused to surrender. During the bombardment, parties from the ships and the infantry from the troopships went ashore. The Italians quickly forced the Ottomans to withdraw into the city by evening. After a short siege, the Ottoman forces withdrew on 29 October, leaving the city to the Italians.

By December, Etruria had been moved to Tobruk, where she provided gunfire support to the Italians defending the city. She was joined there by Etna and twelve torpedo boats. In the meantime, most of the fleet had returned to Italy for refitting. In January 1912, Etruria was moved back to Benghazi. For the next six months she remained here, supporting the garrison against Ottoman counter-attacks. The ship repeatedly shelled the Ottoman camps outside the city. On 15 October, the Ottomans surrendered, ending the war.

By the outbreak of World War I, the ship had been reduced to a training cruiser. The Italian Navy deliberately blew up Etruria in Livorno on 13 August 1918, ostensibly as an act of sabotage by Austro-Hungarian agents in Italy. The purported agents had in fact been coopted as double agents, and the destruction of Etruria was meant to strengthen Austro-Hungarian confidence in their espionage network.

Notes

References

External links
 Etruria Marina Militare website 

Regioni-class cruisers
Ships built in Livorno
1891 ships
Maritime incidents in 1918
Shipwrecks of Italy
World War I shipwrecks in the Mediterranean Sea